Vanessa Pulgarin Monsalve (born September 13, 1991 in Medellín, Antioquia, Colombia) is a Colombian professional model and beauty queen. She represented Antioquia at Miss Colombia 2017 and was crowned Miss International Colombia 2017. She represented Colombia at Miss International 2017 which was held at the Tokyo Dome City Hall in Tokyo, Japan on November 14, 2017.

Personal life 
Vanessa was born in Medellín, Antioquia. She is a social communication student at the Universidad Pontificia Bolivariana. She is also a model by profession. Vanessa describes herself as a woman full of illusions, projects and dreams that will not only benefit her but her entire environment. In her free time, she likes to travel, to learn and to know the different cultures of the world.

Pageantry

Señorita Antioquia 2016 
Vanessa was crowned Miss Antioquia on July 30, 2016 and represented her department at Miss Colombia 2017

Miss Colombia 2017 
She represented the department of Antioquia in the 82nd edition of the Miss Colombia was held on March 20, 2017 where she competed with 23 other candidates representing various departments of Colombia, Bogota, the capital city of Colombia and Cartagena, the host city. In this contest, she was crowned as Miss Colombia International and later, represented her country in Miss International 2017.

Modelling career 
She won Best Revelation Colombian Model at PREMIOS CROMOS DE LA MODA 2014

Catwalk shows 
 Fashion Show (Sri Lanka)
 Colombiatex Fashion Show (Colombia)
 Plataforma K Fashion Show (Colombia)
 Procolombia Fashion Show (Costa Rica)
 SIMB Fashion Show (Colombia)
 Colombiamoda Fashion Show (Colombia)

See also 
 Miss Colombia 2016

References 

1991 births
Living people
Colombian female models
Colombian beauty pageant winners
Miss International 2017 delegates
People from Medellín